Cregier is a surname. Notable people with the surname include:

DeWitt Clinton Cregier (1829–1898), American politician
Martin Cregier (1617–after 1681), German settler in New Amsterdam

See also
Creger
Crevier